Jared Lee Gosselin (born June 23, 1981) is an American record producer from Detroit, Michigan, United States.

Early life
Gosselin was born to Cynthia Lee Gosselin, who is a single mother and works as a hairdresser in Grosse Pointe, Michigan. His father, Paul Joseph Gosselin, a single father, works in the automotive business doing quality control for the big 3.

2013 Latin Grammy win
On November 21, 2013, in Las Vegas, Nevada, Gosselin won his first Grammy Award for the Beto Cuevas album Transformacion for Major Album Pop/Rock – Transformicaion

Current career 

Composer, producer, Mixer for the Netflix Original Carmen Sandiego

Music for the Summer 2018 X Games

Studio : L1N3

Publisher : Royalty Network

Management: Apotheosis Endeavors

TV / Film licensing : North Star Media

Billboard chart peaks by year

Grammy nominations

Discography

Singles

References

External links

1981 births
Living people
Musicians from Detroit
Record producers from Michigan